Almonia truncatalis is a moth in the family Crambidae described by Francis Walker in 1866. It is found in Sri Lanka and on Java and Sula.

References

Acentropinae
Moths of Indonesia
Moths of Sri Lanka
Moths described in 1866